Thomas Crompton (died 1601), was an English politician.

Crompton was the second son of John Crompton of Prestall, Deane, Bolton, Lancashire. He was elected an MP for Steyning in 1589, Radnor in 1593 and for both Leominster and Beverley in 1597. In the latter case it is not recorded which constituency he represented.

He married Mary, the daughter of Robert Hodgson of London, with whom he had 4 sons and 8 or 9 daughters.

References

 

16th-century births
1601 deaths
Members of the Parliament of England (pre-1707) for constituencies in Wales
English MPs 1589
English MPs 1593
English MPs 1597–1598
People from Deane

Year of birth unknown